Fajr Shahid Sepasi Shiraz Football Club (Bashgah-e Futbal-e Fajr-e Sepasi-ye Shiraz), commonly known as Fajr Sepasi Shiraz, or Fajr Sepasi, is an Iranian football club based in Shiraz, Fars, that competes in the Persian Gulf Pro League. The club was founded in 1988.

The football team plays their home games at the Pars Shiraz Stadium which has a seating capacity of 50,000. The club is owned and supported by the Basij.

The club is the second highest supported team in Shiraz after local rival Bargh Shiraz and was known as Moghavemat Shahid Sepasi Shiraz Football Club between 2007 and 2011. Because of the club's affiliation with the Basij, there is the possibility for young players to serve their military service while playing for Fajr Sepasi.

History

Establishment
In 1988, a group of youngsters, who were from Shiraz along with Jafar Jafari, established a football team named Behzad. They started playing in the 2nd division of Shiraz's local city league. After the death of Majid Sepasi during the Iran–Iraq War, the team was renamed in Fajr Shahid Sepasi Shiraz Football Club. Shahid means martyr in Persian. The club was officially founded on 11 February 1988, the day of the Islamic Revolution. In 1991 the club had been bought by Sepah Pasdaran completely. Since then it is possibly for young players to serve their military service while playing for Fajr Sepasi.

The emblem of the team has a calligraphic text in the middle that reads 'Ali' (as tribute to Ali Ibn Abitaleb) designed in four different direction in a symmetrical configuration. Curve-fitted on top of the emblem also reads an Arabic sentence 'قَوِّ عَلى خِدمَتِكَ جَوارِحي' ('qavvi alaa khedmatek a javaarihi) that can be translated to '[o, God], strengthen my limbs and body to serve you' which is an extract from supplication Du'a Kumayl again attributed to Imam Ali.

1990s
In 1995 they became champions of Fars province, and in 1996 were promoted to the Azadegan League. The club has remained in the highest level of Iranian football since then, and surprised everyone when they won the Hazfi Cup in 2001.

Takeover

In December 2006 Sepah Pasdaran sold its shares in sport to Basij, therefore all Fajr teams were renamed to Moghavemat teams. Fajr Sepasi are now officially known as Moghavemat Shahid Sepasi Shiraz, although the name is not in common use yet. Jafar Jafari is the club's chairman since the establishment of the club in 1988.

They kept the coach Gholam Hossein Peyrovani till 2009 where he was appointed as Iran's olympics team head coach and had to leave the club so Peyrovani left the club after 10 years being in charge and he was finished his last season in mid table and was replaced by Davoud Mahabadi and after poor results he was replaced by Mohammad Ahmadzadeh and got relegated in the first season without Peyrovani.

In 2010 for the first time in the club's history, the team was relegated to the Azadegan League for the 2010–2011 season. Fajr quickly rebounded gaining promotion to the Iran Pro League in 2011.

Azadegan League
At the end of the 2013–14 season Fajr Sepasi finished 14th and was relegated to the Azadegan League. In their first season back in the second tier Fajr finished 14th and missed out on promotion.

Shiraz Derby
The Shiraz Derby is played between Fajr Sepasi and Bargh Shiraz, but due to Bargh's relegation to the Azadegan League and then the 2nd Division, the derby has not been played in over 5 years.

Season-by-season
The table below chronicles the achievements of Fajr Sepasi in various competitions since 1995.

Honours
Azadegan League
Champions (1): 2020–21
Hazfi Cup
Champions (1): 2000–01
Runners-up (2): 2001–02, 2002–03
Iranian 2nd Division
Champions (1): 1997
AK Pipe International Cup
Runners-up (1): 2001

Players

First team squad

For recent transfers, see List of Iranian football transfers summer 2021.

Former playersFor details on former players, see: Fajr Sepasi players.''

Head coaches
 Mansour Pourheidari (1996–1998)
 Mahmoud Yavari (1998–1999)
 Gholam Hossein Peyrovani (1999–2009)
 Davoud Mahabadi (2009–2010)
 Mohammad Ahmadzadeh (2010)
 Ali Kalantari (2010–2011)
 Mahmoud Yavari (2011–2013)
 Gholam Hossein Peyrovani (2013)
 Mahmoud Yavari (2013–2014)
 Ali Kalantari (2014–2018)
 Majid Saleh (2018–2019)
 Davoud Mahabadi (2019–2020)
 Ali Kalantari (2020–present)

References

 https://www.youtube.com/watch?v=ydACiq1Y_Ks
 https://web.archive.org/web/20151004210809/http://video.varzesh3.com/iran/premier-league/%D9%81%D8%AC%D8%B1-%D8%B3%D9%BE%D8%A7%D8%B3%DB%8C1-1%D9%BE%D8%B1%D8%B3%D9%BE%D9%88%D9%84%DB%8C%D8%B3/
 https://web.archive.org/web/20151004210850/http://video.varzesh3.com/iran/premier-league/%D9%BE%D8%B1%D8%B3%D9%BE%D9%88%D9%84%DB%8C%D8%B3-2-3-%D9%81%D8%AC%D8%B1-%D8%B3%D9%BE%D8%A7%D8%B3%DB%8C/

External links

 Official club website

Football clubs in Iran
Association football clubs established in 1988
Sport in Shiraz
1988 establishments in Iran